The National Assembly, which is the Legislature of Belize, consists of three bodies: the Governor-General, the Senate and the House of Representatives. Presently, there are thirty-one elected Members of the House of Representatives. The party with the majority of seats in the House of Representatives forms the Government, the Executive branch which has direct control of the civil and military apparatus of state and makes day-to-day decisions on the management of those resources. The Executive is headed by the Prime Minister and his Cabinet. Members of the House of Representatives are elected in a general election under the provisions of the Representation of the People Act while the Members of the Senate are appointed by the Governor-General.

Members

Ministers of State

References 

Politics of Belize
Government of Belize
Belize